Selby Vernon McCasland (September 27, 1896 – November 15, 1970) was an American scholar of religion and was president of the American Academy of Religion in 1949. Earlier in life, he was a coach of American football and basketball at Abilene Christian University.

Religion scholar
McCasland was the author of many books on religion.

Coaching career
McCasland was the first head football coach at Abilene Christian University in Abilene, Texas and he held that position for the 1919 season.  His coaching record at Abilene Christian 2–2.

Head coaching record

Football

References

External links
 

1896 births
1970 deaths
Abilene Christian Wildcats football coaches
Abilene Christian Wildcats men's basketball coaches
Basketball coaches from Texas
Presidents of the American Academy of Religion
People from Comanche, Texas